The Billboard Top Latin albums chart, published in Billboard magazine, is a chart that features Latin music sales information. This data are compiled by Nielsen SoundScan from a sample that includes music stores, music departments at electronics and department stores, internet sales (both physical and via digital downloads) and verifiable sales from concert venues in United States.

There were twenty number-one albums on this chart in 2001, including the first Spanish language album by Christina Aguilera, which spent five weeks at the top in 2001 and 14 weeks in 2000 and won the Latin Grammy Award for Best Female Pop Vocal Album. Ricky Martin, Marco Antonio Solís, Conjunto Primavera and Los Tigres del Norte hit the top spot for the second time on their careers, respectively. Singer-songwriter Marc Anthony with Libre achieved his third chart-topper on this list. Grupo Bryndis became the third act to release two number-one albums in the same year, after Tex-Mex performer Selena on 1995 and 1996 (see: Top Latin Albums of 1995 and Top Latin Albums of 1996) and Enrique Iglesias in 1999 (see: Top Latin Albums of 1999).

Vicente Fernández, Víctor Manuelle, Lupillo Rivera, A.B. Quintanilla and Kumbia Kings, El Original de la Sierra, Jaguares, Joan Sebastian, Ozomatli, Carlos Vives and Los Ángeles de Charly peaked at number one for the first time. Paulina by Mexican performer Paulina Rubio received three Latin Grammy nominations, including Album of the Year and ended the year as the best selling Latin album of 2001.

Albums

References

2001 Latin
United States Latin Albums
2001 in Latin music